Alan J Wright (1938–2013) was an English cricket administrator for the Middlesex County Cricket Club.

External links
  British_Airways obituary February 2013
Middlesex CCC

1938 births
2013 deaths
English cricket administrators
Secretaries of Middlesex County Cricket Club
Date of death missing
Place of birth missing
20th-century English businesspeople